Turkey Party (Türkiye Partisi, TP) was a conservative liberal party in Turkey, which was founded on 25 May 2009 by Abdüllatif Şener in Çankaya, Ankara. It had one seat in Turkish Grand National Assembly.

Şener announced that the party was officially closed on August 27, 2012 due to difficulties to maintain the political goals outside the parliament.

References

External links
Official Site

Political parties established in 2009
2009 establishments in Turkey
2012 disestablishments in Turkey
Defunct conservative parties in Turkey
Liberal conservative parties in Turkey
Organizations based in Ankara
Liberal conservative parties
Political parties disestablished in 2012